Martin Carr (born 29 November 1968) is an English musician and writer who was the chief songwriter and lead guitarist with the band The Boo Radleys.  Born in Thurso, Scotland, he was raised in Wallasey, England.

Life and career
Carr was born in Thurso as his Mancunian father was working at the nuclear facilities at Dounreay at the time: the family moved to Merseyside when Carr was at a very young age. The first single he bought was "Message in a Bottle" by The Police. Martin attended St. Mary's College, Wallasey Village, and played an early gig with The Boo Radleys at The Grand nightclub in New Brighton.

After the breakup of the Boo Radleys, Carr launched a solo career, taking the name bravecaptain from a song by the U.S. rock band Firehose. His solo work has largely been more electronic based than his previous work, and mainly features himself on lead vocals, whereas in The Boo Radleys he rarely sang (despite writing the lyrics).

In 2008, Carr announced that he had recorded a new album in Cardiff with producer Charlie Francis and a few 'friends'. Martin Carr told music website The Quietus about his plans to release the album via the Bandstocks scheme. By the start of the following year Carr had abandoned the Bandstocks project, later commenting to music industry website HitQuarters that "it needs a lot of work and commitment to try and find investors and I couldn't offer either." Instead he released the album Ye Gods (and Little Fishes) in July 2009 on his own new imprint Sonny Boy Records, using the company State 51 for distribution.

Carr explained, during a September 2014 interview for BBC 6music, that he had all but given up hope of a career as a solo artist, and was working on TV themes and other commissions, when German label Tapete Records had contacted him.  The label staff had enquired whether he had any material which they might release.  This, and especially the relaxed nature of the request, led to his 2014 album The Breaks, and its debut single, "Santa Fe Skyway".

In October 2017, Martin released New Shapes of Life on Tapete Records. The third album released under his name and his second with Tapete Records.

bravecaptain discography

Albums
 Fingertip Saint Sessions Vol 1 (14 August 2000)
 Go With Yourself (Fingertip Saint Sessions Vol II) (9 October 2000)
 Nothing Lives Long, He Sang, Only The Earth and The Mountains (2001)
 Advertisements For Myself (14 October 2002)
 All Watched Over By Machines of Loving Grace (2 August 2004)
 allonewordsmallbee (December 2004)

Singles
 Better Living Through Reckless Experimentation (single) (19 March 2001)
 Corporation Man (single) (6 April 2001)
 Captain America (single) (20 August 2001)
 I Am a Lion (single) (29 November 2003)
 Distractions (30 January 2006)

Solo discography

Albums
 Ye Gods (and Little Fishes) (13 July 2009)
 The Breaks (26 September 2014)
 New Shapes of Life (27 October 2017)

Singles and EPs
 Eating the Afterlife (EP) (28 June 2004)
 Sailor/I Will Build a Road (single) (28 May 2012)
 Santa Fe Skyway (single) (31 August 2014)
 Gold Lift (single) (30 March 2017)
 Future Reflections (single) (11 August 2017)
 Three Studies of a Male Back (single) (January 2018)

References

External links
 
 Martin Carr biography from BBC Wales
 Interview with Martin Carr/bravecaptain
 Interview, HitQuarters Sep 2009

1968 births
Living people
Britpop musicians
People from Wallasey
English songwriters
English rock guitarists
English male guitarists
British male songwriters
The Boo Radleys members